This is a list of the main career statistics of professional Russian tennis player, Maria Sharapova, whose career lasted from 2001 to 2020. Sharapova won thirty six WTA singles titles including five Grand Slams, one year-ending championship, six WTA Tier I singles titles, three WTA Premier Mandatory singles titles and five WTA Premier 5 singles titles. She was also the silver medallist in singles at the 2012 London Olympics.

Career achievements 

Sharapova won her first grand slam singles title at the 2004 Wimbledon Championships by defeating top seed and two-time defending champion, Serena Williams in straight sets. She finished the year by winning the year-ending WTA Tour Championships, defeating Williams in three sets after trailing 4–0 in the final set. This was Sharavova's second and last singles win over Williams.

On August 22, 2005, Sharapova became the World No. 1 for the first time in her career, and thus became the first Russian female player to ascend to the top of the WTA rankings. A year later, she won her second grand slam singles title at the 2006 US Open by defeating Justine Henin in the final in straight sets. At the start of 2008, Sharapova won her third grand slam singles title at the 2008 Australian Open, defeating Ana Ivanovic in straight sets.

She finished 2009 ranked World No. 14, having improved her ranking from World No. 126 when she returned to the sport after a lengthy injury break.
In April 2011, Sharapova returned to the top ten of the WTA rankings for the first time in three years after losing to Victoria Azarenka in the final of the Sony Ericsson Open. In May, she won her biggest title on clay at the time in Rome, defeating Samantha Stosur in the final. At Wimbledon, she reached her first grand slam singles final in three years but lost in straight sets to first time grand slam finalist, Petra Kvitová. Sharapova finished the year ranked World No. 4, her best finish since 2008.

In January 2012, Sharapova reached her first Australian Open final since winning the title in 2008 but lost to in straight sets to first time grand slam singles finalist, Victoria Azarenka. She avenged that defeat three months later by defeating Azarenka in the final at Stuttgart before successfully defending her title at the Internazionali BNL d'Italia by defeating Li Na in the final after trailing by a set and 4–0 and having been down championship point in the deciding set. At the 2012 French Open, Sharapova won her first grand slam singles title in four years and fourth title overall after defeating first time grand slam finalist, Sara Errani in straight sets. With this achievement, Sharapova returned to World No. 1 in the WTA rankings and became the sixth woman in the open era to complete a Career Grand Slam in singles. The rest of her season was highlighted by a silver medal at the London Olympics, her first semi-final appearance at the US Open since winning the title in 2006 and runner-up finishes at the China Open (her third defeat in the final of a Premier Mandatory event this year) and WTA Tour Championships. She ended the year ranked World No. 2, matching her career best finish to date.

In March 2013, Sharapova won her second title in Indian Wells but lost her fifth final in Miami. The following year, she dominated the clay court season, winning a third consecutive title in Stuttgart, her first title in Madrid and her fifth major and second French Open title. She also won the China Open later that year and finished as World No. 2 for the third time in her career. In 2015, Sharapova made the final of the Australian Open, won her third title in Rome, was a semi-finalist at Wimbledon and won both matches in Russia's 3–2 defeat to the Czech Republic in the Fed Cup final.

Performance timeline

Singles 
Only main-draw results in WTA Tour, Grand Slam tournaments and Olympic Games are included in win–loss records.

 While Sharapova did reach the quarterfinals of the 2016 Australian Open, this result, including ranking points and prize money, was rescinded following a failed drug test during the tournament.
 The first Premier 5 event of the year has switched back and forth between the Dubai Tennis Championships and the Qatar Open since 2009. Dubai was classified as a Premier 5 event from 2009 to 2011 before being succeeded by Doha for the 2012–2014 period. Since 2015, it has alternated, being held in Dubai in odd years and Doha in even years.
 In 2009, the WTA German Open was abolished and replaced by the Madrid Open.
 After 2007, the Southern California Open was downgraded and replaced in 2009 by the Cincinnati Masters.
 In 2014, the Pan Pacific Open was downgraded to a Premier event and replaced by the Wuhan Open.
 In 2009, the Zurich Open was downgraded to a Premier event and replaced by the China Open.

Significant finals

Grand Slam tournament finals

Singles: 10 finals (5 titles, 5 runner-ups)

WTA Tour Championships

Singles: 3 (1 title, 2 runner-ups)

(i) = Indoor

Tier I / Premier Mandatory & Premier 5 finals

Singles: 25 (14 titles, 11 runner-ups)

Olympic finals

Singles: 1 (1 silver medal)

WTA career finals

Singles: 59 (36 titles, 23 runner-ups)

Doubles: 4 (3 titles, 1 runner-up)

ITF Circuit finals

Singles: 6 (4 titles, 2 runner–ups)

Junior Grand Slam tournament finals

Singles: 2 finals (2 runner-ups)

Fed Cup

Finals (1 title, 1 final)

Participations (6)

Singles: 6 (7–1)

Record against top 10 players
Sharapova's record against players who have been ranked in the top 10.

As of January 27, 2019.  All statistics from the Women's Tennis Association.

No. 1 wins

Top 10 wins

WTA Tour career earnings

*As of April 29, 2019

Longest winning streaks

19 match win streak (2006)

Grand Slam double bagels
Sharapova has had six double bagel – two sets won at love (6–0, 6–0) – victories in Grand Slams to date. Two of these victories came in back-to-back rounds at the 2013 Australian Open, making Sharapova the first to complete such a feat since Wendy Turnbull at the 1985 Australian Open.

Grand Slam titles details

Grand Slam tournament seedings

Winner
Runner Up

See also
 List of Grand Slam Women's Singles champions
 WTA Tour records

References

External links

 Maria Sharapova's official website
 
 
 

Maria Sharapova
Tennis career statistics